Nemanja Dančetović (born 25 July 1973) is a Serbian former professional footballer who played as a midfielder.

Career
During his journeyman career, Dančetović played for numerous clubs, including Priština (on two occasions; debuted in the 1991–92 Yugoslav Second League), Čukarički, Radnički Kragujevac (on loan), Milicionar (scored 10 goals in the 1999–2000 First League of FR Yugoslavia), Ulsan Hyundai Horang-i (made six appearances in the 2000 K League), Enköpings SK (appeared in four games in the 2001 Superettan), Radnički Obrenovac (twice), Sutjeska Nikšić, Patraikos, Srem, BASK, Hajduk Beograd, Mladost Lučani (made one appearance in the 2007–08 Serbian Cup), and Radnički Niš.

In early 2016, at the age of 42, Dančetović came out of retirement to play for his former club Hajduk Beograd in the Belgrade Zone League, the fourth tier of Serbian football.

Honours
Hajduk Beograd
 Serbian League Belgrade: 2006–07

References

External links
 
 

1973 births
Living people
Sportspeople from Pristina
Kosovo Serbs
Yugoslav footballers
Serbia and Montenegro footballers
Serbian footballers
Association football midfielders
FK Čukarički players
FK Radnički 1923 players
FK Milicionar players
Ulsan Hyundai FC players
FK Radnički Obrenovac players
FK Sutjeska Nikšić players
Patraikos F.C. players
FK Srem players
FK BASK players
FK Hajduk Beograd players
FK Mladost Lučani players
FK Radnički Niš players
Yugoslav Second League players
First League of Serbia and Montenegro players
Second League of Serbia and Montenegro players
K League 1 players
Superettan players
Super League Greece 2 players
Serbian First League players
Serbia and Montenegro expatriate footballers
Expatriate footballers in South Korea
Expatriate footballers in Sweden
Expatriate footballers in Greece
Serbia and Montenegro expatriate sportspeople in South Korea
Serbia and Montenegro expatriate sportspeople in Sweden
Serbia and Montenegro expatriate sportspeople in Greece